The Supermarine Southampton was a flying boat of the interwar period designed and produced by the British aircraft manufacturer Supermarine. It was one of the most successful flying boats of the era.

The Southampton was derived from the experimental Supermarine Swan, and thus was developed at a relatively high pace. According to the aviation authors C. F. Andrews and E. B. Morgan, the design of the Southampton represented a new standard for maritime aircraft, and was a major accomplished for Supermarine's design team, headed by R. J. Mitchell. Demand for the type was such that Supermarine had to expand its production capacity to keep up.

During August 1925, the Southampton entered service with the Royal Air Force (RAF), with whom the type gained a favourable reputation via a series of long-distance formation flights. Further customers emerged for the type, including the Imperial Japanese Navy, Argentine Naval Aviation, and Royal Danish Navy. Several were also adopted by civilian operators, such as Imperial Airways and Japan Air Transport. Amongst other feats, the Southampton facilitated an early ten-passenger cross-channel airline service between England and France.

Development

Background
The origins of the Southampton can be traced back to an earlier experimental aircraft, the Supermarine Swan, which made its maiden flight on 25 March 1924. Around the same time frame, British authorities were having a difficult time procuring effective large flying boats, having been disappointed by types such as the Felixstowe F.5; according to Andrews and Morgan, officials were close to giving up their ambitions. Having been impressed by the Swan's performance during trials held at RAF Felixstowe, the British Air Ministry generated Specification R.18/24 and promptly ordered a batch of six production aircraft, named Southampton, from Supermarine. This order was directly from the drawing board, an unusual arrangement that showed substantial confidence in the design.

Supermarine's design team on the Southampton was headed by the aeronautical engineer R. J. Mitchell, better known as the designer of the later Spitfire. As the Swan had acted in effect as a prototype, the development time was relatively compact. Simplicity was a key philosophy practised by the design team, leading to the elimination of tradition cross-bracing wires between the wings. Despite this, traditional manufacturing practices of the era were often spurned in favour of new approaches, such as the deliberate avoidance of integrating the lower wing with the fuselage to leave the decking and inner wing section free to be independently worked upon.

Into flight
On 10 March 1925, the maiden flight of the first production aircraft was conducted; piloted by Henry Charles Biard. While this flight was largely successful, one of the wingtip floats sustained minor damage, leading to their angle of incidence being quickly adjusted to prevent reoccurrence prior to their complete redesign later on. Four days later, the contractor's trials were completed, thus the Southampton was promptly flown to Felixstowe, where it underwent type trials. These were passed with relative ease, including its ability to maintain altitude on only a single engine, leading to the aircraft's formal delivery to the Royal Air Force (RAF) occurring during mid-1925.

Following the completion of the initial six aircraft, further orders for the Southampton were promptly received. Supermarine lacked the factory capacity to keep up with demand, thus an additional facility were acquired on the other side of Southampton Water, after which production of the type was centred in this location. Throughout the type's production run, the Southampton's design continued to be refined; changes included improved engines models and the substitution of the wooden hull and its wings with metal (duralumin) counterparts. By the end of production, a total of 83 Southamptons were constructed, excluding the three-engined Southampton MK X, which was a single prototype.

Several models and derivates of the Southampton were developed; it was effectively replaced in production by the Supermarine Scapa, which was one such derivative.

Design
The Supermarine Southampton was a twin-engine biplane flying boat, which was typically powered by a pair of Napier Lion twelve-cylinder engines. The engines are mount on pylons positioned between the wings in a tractor configuration. The engine installation enabled both maintenance and engine swaps to be performed without any interaction with the wing structure. Fuel was gravity-fed to the engines from tanks within the upper wings, the fuselage was kept free of any fuel lines, aside from a fuel pump used to refill the wingtanks from an aft sump while at anchor. The crew were positioned so that they could readily communicate with one another. There were three positions for machine guns, one set upon the nose and two staggered towards either side of the rear fuselage. These rear gunners had a relatively favourable field of fire.

The Southampton's structure was revised substantially over successive batches. All metallic elements were anodised to deter corrosion. During 1929, 24 of the Southampton Mk Is were converted by having newly-built metal hulls replacing the wooden ones. Later on, the type was also furnished with metal propellers produced by Leitner-Watts. Some of the later aircraft were built with metal wings and were probably designated as Southampton Mk III, although this designation's usage has been disputed.

Operational history
During August 1925, the first Southamptons entered service with the RAF, the type being initially assigned to No. 480 (Coastal Reconnaissance) Flight, based at RAF Calshot. As validated through a series of exercises, the ability of the Southampton to independently operate, even within inhospitable weather conditions, was well proven. Andrews and Morgan observed that the Southampton quickly proved itself to have primacy amongst European flying boats of the era, a fact that was promptly demonstrated by its overseas activities.

Amongst the tasks of which RAF Southamptons performed was a series of "showing the flag" long-distance formation flights. Perhaps the most notable of these flights was a  expedition conducted during 1927 and 1928; it was carried out by four Southamptons of the Far East Flight, setting out from Felixstowe via the Mediterranean and India to Singapore. These aircraft featured various technical changes, including enlarged fuel tanks composed of tinned steel, increased oil tankage, greater radiator surface area, and the removal of all armaments. According to Andrews and Morgan, the Southampton acquired considerable fame amongst the general public from these flights; Supermarine also shared in this reputation gain. There were also practical benefits of these flights, as new anti-corrosion techniques were developed as a result of feedback.

While the RAF was the type's most high-profile customer, further Southamptons were sold to a number of other countries. Eight new aircraft were sold to Argentina, with Turkey purchasing six aircraft and Australia buying two ex-RAF Mk 1 aircraft. Japan also purchased a single aircraft which was later converted into an 18-passenger cabin airliner. The United States Navy also requested a quote, but no order materialised. One RAF aircraft was loaned to Imperial Airways, with British Civil Registration G-AASH, for three months from December 1929 to replace a crashed Short Calcutta on the airmail run between Genoa and Alexandria.

Variants

Different powerplants were fitted in variants:
 Mk I
 Napier Lion V engine, wooden hull. 23 built.
 Mk II
 Napier Lion Va, 39 built
 Saunders A.14
 Argentina
 Lorraine-Dietrich 12E. Five wooden-hulled + three metal-hulled aircraft.
 Turkey
 Hispano-Suiza 12Nbr. Six built.

 Bristol Jupiter IX and Rolls-Royce Kestrel in experiments
 Mk IV Supermarine Scapa prototype

Operators

Military operators

Argentine Naval Aviation (8)

 Royal Australian Air Force
 No. 1 Flying Training School's Seaplane Squadron RAAF

 Royal Danish Navy

 Imperial Japanese Navy

Turkish Air Force

 Royal Air Force
 No. 201 Squadron RAF
 No. 203 Squadron RAF
 No. 204 Squadron RAF
 No. 205 Squadron RAF
 No. 209 Squadron RAF
 No. 210 Squadron RAF
 No. 480 (Coastal Reconnaissance) Flight RAF

Civil operators

Japan Air Transport
Nippon Kokuyuso Kenkyujo

 Imperial Airways

Surviving aircraft
The restored wooden fuselage of Supermarine Southampton 1 N9899 is on display at the Royal Air Force Museum in Hendon.

Specifications (Southampton II)

See also

References

Citations

Bibliography

 Andrews, C.F. and E.B. Morgan. Supermarine Aircraft Since 1914. London: Putnam, 1981. .
 Andrews, C.F. and E.B. Morgan. Supermarine Aircraft since 1914 (2nd ed.). London: Putnam, 1987. .
 Jackson, A. J. British Civil Aircraft since 1919 Volume 3, 1974, Putnam, London, .
 Kightly, James. "Database: Supermarine Southampton". Aeroplane, April 2020, Vol. 48, No. 4. pp. 75–87. .
 Thetford, Owen. Aircraft of the Royal Air Force 1918–57 (First Edition ed.). London: Putnam, 1957.

Further reading

External links
 Flying boats visit Plymouth: Film of the RAF Far East Flight's four Supermarine Southampton landing at Plymouth from Felixstowe en route to Australia and Singapore.

Southampton
1920s British military reconnaissance aircraft
Flying boats
Biplanes
Aircraft first flown in 1925
Twin piston-engined tractor aircraft